Joseph Jude Tyson (born October 16, 1957) is an American prelate of the Roman Catholic Church who has been serving as the bishop of the Diocese of Yakima Washington State since 2011. He previously served as an auxiliary bishop of the Archdiocese of Seattle in Washington State from 2005 to 2011.

Biography

Early life 
Joseph Tyson was born on October 16, 1957, in Moses Lake, Washington, and attended Blessed Sacrament Parish School in Seattle. He then entered St. Alphonsus Elementary School in Seattle in 1971 and graduated from Bishop Blanchet High School in Seattle in 1975. Tyson then studied at Shoreline Community College in Shoreline, Washington, and the University of Washington in Seattle  He obtained in 1980 a Bachelor of Arts degree in Russian and Eastern European area Studies and a Bachelor of Arts degree in editorial journalism.

Tyson earned a Master of International Relations degree from the Jackson School of International Studies at the University of Washington in 1984, and a Master of Divinity degree from the Theological College of the Catholic University of America in Washington, D.C., in 1989.

Priesthood 
Tyson was ordained to the priesthood for the Archdiocese of Seattle on June 10, 1989 by Archbishop Raymond Hunthausen. After his ordination, Tyson had the following pastoral assignments in parishes in Washington:

 Parochial vicar at St. James Cathedral in Seattle (1991–93) 
 Pastor of St. Mary of the Valley in Monroe (1993–96)
 Pastor of St. Edward, St. George and of St. Paul in Seattle  (1996–2005)

In addition to his pastoral assignments, Tyson assisted chancery offices in the area of permanent deacon formation, parish experiences for seminarians, vocations, and communications.

Auxiliary Bishop of Seattle
On May 12, 2005, Tyson was appointed auxiliary bishop of the Archdiocese of Seattle and titular bishop of Migirpa by Pope Benedict XVI. He received his episcopal consecration on June 6 2005 from Archbishop Alexander Brunett, with Bishops George Thomas and Gustavo Garcia-Siller, serving as co-consecrators. He selected as his episcopal motto: "Christo Lumen ad Gentes."

In 2007, Tyson testified at a Washington State Legislature hearing on a proposed Washington initiative to offer domestic partnership benefits to same-sex couples; he promoted broadening its provisions, a controversial strategy used elsewhere by the Catholic Church, extending the definition of partnership to relationships beyond that of unmarried couples, to prevent discrimination against an elderly parent, a sibling, housemate or another in residence thus limiting its potential affirmative impact for gay rights, consistent with the Catholic Church's long-standing position.

Tyson became interim superintendent of Seattle Catholic schools on July 1, 2008. He is a devoted cyclist, even receiving news of his episcopal appointment while riding his bike. In addition to his native English, he speaks Spanish, German, Vietnamese, and Serbo-Croatian.

Bishop of Yakima
On April 12, 2011, Benedict XVI appointed Tyson as the seventh bishop of the Diocese of Yakima, replacing Bishop Carlos Sevilla. Tyson was installed on May 31, 2011, at Holy Family Parish in Yakima, Washington.

See also

 Catholic Church hierarchy
 Catholic Church in the United States
 Historical list of the Catholic bishops of the United States
 List of Catholic bishops of the United States
 Lists of patriarchs, archbishops, and bishops

References

External links

Roman Catholic Diocese of Yakima Official Site

Episcopal succession

 

1957 births
Living people
People from Moses Lake, Washington
Roman Catholic bishops of Yakima
21st-century Roman Catholic bishops in the United States
University of Washington College of Arts and Sciences alumni
Catholic University of America alumni
Roman Catholic Archdiocese of Seattle
Bishop Blanchet High School alumni